Michael Duhaney Malcolm (born 13 October 1985) is an English footballer who played in the Football League for Stockport County.

Youth career
Malcolm joined Wycombe Wanderers as a schoolboy, but in March 2000, aged 14, was signed by Tottenham Hotspur for an initial fee of £10,000, progressing to be a trainee at Tottenham.

Senior career

Stockport County
On failing to make the grade joined Stockport County in July 2005. His league debut came on 6 August 2005 when he came on as a late substitute for Keith Briggs in a 2–2 draw at home to Mansfield Town. Malcolm was due to have a trial with Werder Bremen with a view to a permanent move, but Bremen decided to pull the plug. He was released by Stockport in May 2007 after making 41 league appearances.

Kettering
Malcolm signed for Conference North side Kettering Town in August 2007. He made his debut in the 2007–08 season opener at Stalybridge Celtic.

Rushden and Diamonds
In September 2007 he moved to Conference National side Rushden & Diamonds. After a promising home debut, Malcolm opened his account at Rushden by scoring what would prove to be the winner away at Weymouth after coming on as a second-half substitute. He joined Weymouth on non-contract terms on 4 January 2008.

Crawley Town
He re-signed for Crawley Town on 1 July 2010 after he was earlier unable to agree a new contract. He went out on loan to Hayes & Yeading in August 2010.

Farnborough
On 14 December 2010 Crawley Town announced that his contract had been cancelled. Later that month he signed for Farnborough.

Lewes
In July 2011 Malcolm signed for Lewes in the Isthmian League Premier Division.

Bromley
On 3 February, he signed for Conference South side Bromley. He scored Bromley's equaliser in their 1–1 away draw with Thurrock on his debut on 14 February 2012. Bromley announced on 4 January 2013 that Malcolm was leaving the club with immediate effect, by mutual agreement.

Whitehawk
In July 2013, Malcolm signed for Ryman Premier side Whitehawk.

Maidenhead United
Malcolm signed for Conference South side Maidenhead United in July 2013 on a free transfer.

Wealdstone
On 25 January, Malcolm scored a deft header to score his first goal for Wealdstone after joining.

Second spell at Whitehawk
For the 2014/15 season, Malcolm rejoined Whitehawk, but only made one appearance for the team.

St Alban's City
In 2015, Malcolm joined National League South side St Alban's City, going on to make 16 appearances, scoring 4 goals.

Cambridge City
In September 2015, Malcolm signed for Southern League side Cambridge City. He went on to make 19 appearances for the side, scoring 9 goals in total.

Staines Town
In December 2015, Malcolm left Cambridge after finding it hard to travel to the games and subsequently joined Southern League Premier Division side Staines Town.

Cray Wanderers
Later in the same season, Malcolm moved to Northamptonshire club Cray Wanderers for a short period, making one appearance.

Hayes and Yeading
Malcolm saw off the rest of the 2015/16 season at Southern League side Hayes and Yeading United, making one appearance.

Chalfont St Peter
Malcolm joined fellow Southern League side Chalfont St Peter, making three cup appearances for the Buckinghamshire side.

Barton Rovers
In November 2016, Malcolm signed for Barton Rovers. He made 24 appearances in all competitions, scoring 4 goals in the process.

Hanwell Town
For the 2017/18 season, Malcolm signed for Hanwell Town.

References

External links

1985 births
Living people
Footballers from Harrow, London
English footballers
Association football forwards
Wycombe Wanderers F.C. players
Tottenham Hotspur F.C. players
Stockport County F.C. players
Kettering Town F.C. players
Rushden & Diamonds F.C. players
Weymouth F.C. players
Crawley Town F.C. players
Hayes & Yeading United F.C. players
Farnborough F.C. players
Lewes F.C. players
Bromley F.C. players
Whitehawk F.C. players
Maidenhead United F.C. players
Wealdstone F.C. players
St Albans City F.C. players
Cray Wanderers F.C. players
Barton Rovers F.C. players
English Football League players
National League (English football) players
Isthmian League players
Southern Football League players